A list of films produced by the Bollywood film industry based in Mumbai in 1967:

Top-grossing films
The top ten grossing films at the Indian Box Office in 1967:

Films

References

External links
 Bollywood films of 1967 at the Internet Movie Database
 Indian Film Songs from the Year 1967 – a look back at 1967 with a special focus on Hindi film songs
Listen to songs from Bollywood films of 1967

1967
Bollywood
Films, Bollywood